Nenmeni  is a village near Bathery in Wayanad district in the state of Kerala, India.

Demographics
 India census, Nenmeni had a population of 28476 with 14097 males and 14379 females.
There is also a village called Nenmeni in Virudhunagar District, Tamil Nadu

Transportation
Nenmeni can be accessed from Sultan Battery. The Periya ghat road connects Mananthavady to Kannur and Thalassery.  The Thamarassery mountain road connects Calicut with Kalpetta. The Kuttiady mountain road connects Vatakara with Kalpetta and Mananthavady. The Palchuram mountain road connects Kannur and Iritty with Mananthavady.  The road from Nilambur to Ooty is also connected to Wayanad through the village of Meppadi.

The nearest railway station is at Mysore and the nearest airports are Kozhikode International Airport-120 km, Bengaluru International Airport-290 km, and   Kannur International Airport, 58 km.

Gallery

References

Villages in Wayanad district
Sultan Bathery area